Mati Diop (born 22 June 1982) is a French-Senegalese filmmaker and actress who starred in the 2008 film 35 Shots of Rum. She also directed the 2019 film Atlantics, for which she became the first black female director to be in contention for the Cannes Film Festival's highest prize, the Palme d'Or. At Cannes, Atlantics won the Grand Prix. She also won awards for her short film, Mille Soleils (2013) and Snow Canon (2011).

Early life
Diop was born in Paris, France, and is a member of the prominent Senegalese Diop family. Her father, Wasis Diop, is a Senegalese musician and her mother, Christine Brossard, is an art buyer and photographer. She is the niece of prominent Senegalese filmmaker Djibril Diop Mambéty. During her childhood she often traveled back and forth between France and Senegal, developing a transnational identity.

Education
Mati Diop trained in the Advanced Degree Program at Le Fresnoy National Studio of Contemporary Art in France, as well as at The Palais de Tokyo in their experimental artist studio space Le Pavillon.

Diop studied at the Radcliffe Institute for Advanced Study from 2014 to 2015. While a part of the institute's selective Film Study Center Fellowship Program, she wrote the script for her first feature film Fire, Next Time. She later changed the title of this film to what is now known as her directorial feature film debut, Atlantics (2019).

Career

Directing 
Mati Diop made her directorial debut in 2004 with her short film Last Night (2004). Her short film Atlantiques (2009) won the Rotterdam International Film Festival's Tiger Award for Short Film, and a Top Prize at Media City Film Festival during her first North American appearance in 2009.

Her documentary short Mille Soleils was released in 2013. The film focused on actor Magaye Niang, who was the star of Diop's uncle's seminal feature Touki Bouki (1973) and explained how he had come to live as a farmer in the intervening years. The film played at the 2013 Toronto International Film Festival and was later also programmed at the Museum of Modern Art in 2014.

In 2019, she became the first black female director to have her film premiere in competition at the Cannes Film Festival when her feature debut Atlantics was selected to compete for the Palme d'Or. She was one of only four women accepted into the festival in the given year. The film was a fictional adaptation of her documentary short Atlantiques made in 2009 that followed two friends from Senegal as they made a life-threatening boat crossing to Europe. The film won the Grand Prix. It was picked up by Netflix shortly following Cannes' award announcements.

Diop directed a documentary, In My Room, as part of Miu Miu's Women's Tales series, which blended audio recordings of her maternal grandmother, Maji, with footage Diop shot of herself in her Parisian apartment during the time she was quarantined during the 2020 COVID-19 Pandemic.

Mati Diop's work has also been featured at the Venice Film Festival, the New York Film Festival, the BFI London Film Festival in 2012, and the Valdivia International Film Festival, as well as the Museum of the Moving Image in 2013.

Acting
Diop made her acting debut in Claire Denis' film 35 Shots of Rum (2008), playing the lead role of a young woman in a close-knit relationship with her father, whom she has trouble leaving as she gets ready for marriage. She received a nomination for the Lumières Award for most promising actress for her role in the film. In 2012, she appeared in the film Simon Killer and was also credited with the story behind the script. Diop continues to act sporadically in films and television.

Artistry and themes 
In their article on Diop's work up to Atlantics (2019), Lindsay Turner states that Diop's work is often concerned with trans-nationalism, immigration, the female experience, and post-colonialism in relation with North Africa and Europe. Additionally, Diop is known to use aspects of magical realism in her films, examples including Atlantics (2019), Snow Cannon (2011), and Big in Vietnam (2012). Diop can also be quoted talking about her storytelling processes, notably on how she uses sets and props to convey her plots as opposed to just characters and dialogue. During additional interviews, Diop has mentioned that she has done a majority of her own cinematography and is deeply interested in multiculturalism and multilingualism in film, as her films are often in two to three different languages.

Filmography

Acting

Filmmaking

Accolades

References

External links

 

Living people
1982 births
Film directors from Paris
French people of Senegalese descent
French film actresses
21st-century French actresses
Actresses from Paris
Senegalese women film directors